Olhuvelifushi is one of the inhabited islands of Lhaviyani Atoll.

Geography

Demography

References

Islands of the Maldives